Two warships of Japan have borne the name Amagiri:

 , a  launched in 1930 and sunk in 1944
 , an  launched in 1986

Japanese Navy ship names